The North Sinai Archaeological Sites Zone is composed of a collection of important ancient sites between the Suez Canal and Gaza along the Mediterranean coast of Egypt.

Archaeology 
In 2020, limestone cave decorated with scenes of animals such as donkeys, camels, deer, mule and mountain goats was uncovered in the area of Wadi Al-Zulma by the archaeological mission from the Tourism and Antiquities Ministry. Rock art cave is 15 meters deep and 20 meters high.

World Heritage Status
This site was added to the UNESCO World Heritage Tentative List on November 1, 1994, in the Cultural category.

Notes

References
North Sinai archaeological Sites Zone - UNESCO World Heritage Centre Retrieved 2009-03-04.

Cultural heritage
Egyptian culture